Skeletonema japonicum is a diatom. Together with S. pseudocostatum, S. tropicum, and S. grethae, it possesses external processes of its fultoportulae that have narrow tips which connect with those of sibling cells via fork-, knot-, or knuckle-like unions.

References

Further reading
Kooistra, Wiebe HCF, et al. "Global diversity and biogeography of Skeletonema species (Bacillariophyta)." Protist 159.2 (2008): 177–193.
Alverson, Andrew J., and Leanne Kolnick. "Intragenomic nucleotide polymorphism among small subunit (18s) rDNA paralogs in the diatom genus skeletonema (bacillariophyta) 1." Journal of phycology 41.6 (2005): 1248–1257.
Vargas, Cristian A., Rubén Escribano, and Serge Poulet. "Phytoplankton food quality determines time windows for successful zooplankton reproductive pulses." Ecology 87.12 (2006): 2992–2999.

External links

AlgaeBase

Protists described in 2005
Thalassiosirales